The 2013–14 Nebraska Cornhuskers men's basketball team represented the University of Nebraska–Lincoln in the 2013–14 NCAA Division I men's basketball season. Led by head coach Tim Miles, in his second season, the Cornhuskers team played its home games in the brand new Pinnacle Bank Arena in downtown Lincoln, Nebraska, and were a member of the Big Ten Conference. They finished the season with a record 19–13 overall, 11–7 in Big Ten play for a 4th-place finish, despite being predicted by many to finish last in the conference. They lost in the quarterfinals in the 2014 Big Ten Conference men's basketball tournament to Ohio State. They received at-large bid to the 2014 NCAA Division I men's basketball tournament for the first time since 1998. They lost in the first round to Baylor.

Departures from previous season

Incoming recruits 

Tim Wagner, a 6-3 guard from Galesville, Wisconsin joined the team as a walk-on.

Roster 

 
}

Early departures

Jordan Tyrance
On November 5, 2013, just one day after the Cornhuskers defeated in-state opponent Nebraska-Kearney in an exhibition game, walk-on Jordan Tyrance informed head coach Tim Miles that he was leaving the team due to personal reasons, stating, '"I just had some personal things that I needed to take care of. I love the sport, I mean collegiate sports get tough, and it's a big time commitment.'" Besides having balanced homework and practice, Tyrance was also caring for his two-year-old daughter Kyalinn. '"I had some family I need to spend time with, a daughter, and just needed to handle my home stuff. She's my life [and] she deserves to have a father that's around, and watching her grow up.'"

Deverell Biggs
Deverell Biggs did not play and was absent from the team during their win over Minnesota on January 26, 2013. Biggs tweeted that his absence was due to "personal reasons." On January 27, 2014 Head Coach Miles dismissed Biggs from the team. According to sources Biggs missed a film session on the day of the Minnesota game, but according to Miles, no single incident led to Biggs' dismissal.

Biggs was the first in-state recruit to sign with Nebraska in 10 seasons, but faced a number of disciplinary woes prior to his dismissal. In December 2012, during Biggs' redshirt season, he was cited for DUI and leaving the scene of an accident. That led to a two-game suspension to start the 2013-2014 season. Biggs didn't make the trip to Cincinnati on December 28, 2013 for disciplinary reasons after missing a film session. Biggs was also cited Jan. 5 by University of Nebraska-Lincoln police for running a stop sign and driving on a suspended license.

Schedule 

|-
!colspan=9 style=|Exhibition

|-
!colspan=9 style=|Non-conference regular season

|-
!colspan=9 style=|Big Ten  regular season

|-
!colspan=9 style=|Big Ten tournament

|-
!colspan=9 style=|NCAA tournament

Source:

See also
2013–14 Nebraska Cornhuskers women's basketball team

References

Nebraska
Nebraska Cornhuskers men's basketball seasons
Nebraska
Corn
Corn